Sharpham is a village and civil parish on the Somerset Levels near Street and Glastonbury in the Mendip district of Somerset, England.
It is located near the River Brue.

Governance 

The parish council has responsibility for local issues, including setting an annual precept (local rate) to cover the council’s operating costs and producing annual accounts for public scrutiny. The parish council evaluates local planning applications and works with the local police, district council officers, and neighbourhood watch groups on matters of crime, security, and traffic. The parish council's role also includes initiating projects for the maintenance and repair of parish facilities, as well as consulting with the district council on the maintenance, repair, and improvement of highways, drainage, footpaths, public transport, and street cleaning. Conservation matters (including trees and listed buildings) and environmental issues are also the responsibility of the council.

The village falls within the Street North ward, electing two councillors to Mendip District Council, which was formed on 1 April 1974 under the Local Government Act 1972, having previously been part of Wells Rural District, which is responsible for local planning and building control, local roads, council housing, environmental health, markets and fairs, refuse collection and recycling, cemeteries and crematoria, leisure services, parks, and tourism.

It is also part of the Mendip West ward, which elects one county councillor to Somerset County Council which is responsible for running the largest and most expensive local services such as education, social services, libraries, main roads, public transport, policing and  fire services, trading standards, waste disposal and strategic planning.

It is also part of the Wells county constituency represented in the House of Commons of the Parliament of the United Kingdom. It elects one Member of Parliament (MP) by the first past the post system of election.

Sharpham Park estate 

Sharpham Park is a  historic park dates back to the Bronze Age. The first known reference is a grant by King Edwy to the then Aethelwold in 957. In 1191 Sharpham Park was conferred by the soon-to-be King John I to the Abbots of Glastonbury, who remained in possession of the park and house until the dissolution of the monasteries in 1539. From 1539 to 1707 the park was owned by the Duke of Somerset, Sir Edward Seymour, brother of Queen Jane; the Thynne family of Longleat, and the family of Sir Henry Gould. Edward Dyer was born here in 1543. The house is now a private residence and Grade II* listed building. It was the birthplace of Sir Edward Dyer (died 1607) an Elizabethan poet and courtier, the writer Henry Fielding (1707–54), and the cleric William Gould. Also home to the Laver family, one of the largest cattle dealers in the west country in the nineteenth century.

The Sharpham Park estate is now owned by Roger Saul, founder of the Mulberry fashion company, and produces organic foods specialising in spelt (an ancient cereal grain). A restoration project is underway, partly funded by the "Countryside Stewardship" scheme from DEFRA. It involves restoring, preserving and maintaining archaeological and historic features including a Bronze Age trackway and a duck decoy pond that is a Scheduled Ancient Monument. This will allow the reintroduction of red deer (Cervus elaphus) along with other rare breeds of sheep and cattle.

Sharpham Moor Plot 

Nearby is the Sharpham Moor Plot Site of Special Scientific Interest, where detailed plant records exist from as far back as 1915, and continue up to the present day.

Peat extraction 

Peat extraction is still active around the village. This has been a significant industry for many years in the surrounding villages of Meare, Shapwick, Ashcott, and Walton on Westhay Moor, and is remembered at the Peat Moors Centre at Westhay.

References

External links 
Sharpham Park

Villages in Mendip District
Somerset Levels
Grade II* listed buildings in Mendip District